Marianne dela Riva, is a Filipino actress, popularly known as Luisa in Gulong ng Palad, a classic TV series in the Philippines aired in 1977. She was the favorite leading lady of action king Fernando Poe, Jr. and other action stars in the 1980s.

Career
It was fashion designer Pitoy Moreno who discovered Marianne at the age of 16. She used to be one of his models. She became one of Manila's Prettiest. She became a fashion model and then became a print model. She appeared in more than 75 movies and television shows since she started as leading lady of Cocoy Laurel in 1973 movie Love Song. She was nominated as Best Supporting Actress 1975 FAMAS Award for Krimen: Kayo Ang Humatol (1974).

She used to be the most visible actress in the action movie genre. In the 1980s, Marianne would come into mind as the leading lady of action stars. Fernando Poe, Jr. openly admitted that Marianne his favorite leading lady. Marianne did movies with action stars: Dante Varona in Carding Estrabel: Tirador ng Malabon (1980), Rey Malonzo in Kumander .45 (1982), Lito Lapid in Zigomar (1984), Rudy Fernandez in Anak ng Tondo (1985), Phillip Salvador in Delima Gang (1989), Anthony Alonzo in Irampa si Mediavillo (1990), and Eddie Garcia in Mayor Latigo (1991), among others. She did much action movies with Fernando Poe, Jr.

On television made the characters of Marianne as Luisa, Ronald Corveau as Carding, Caridad Sanchez as Aling Idad, Romnick Sarmenta as Peping, Beth Bautista as Mimi, in 1977 TV series Gulong ng Palad, a great love story of Luisa & Carding, rolled over to television via Banahaw Broadcasting Network, the Philippine TV's first soap opera made household names, ended in 1985. ABS-CBN produced in 2006 remake of Gulong ng Palad topbilled by Kristine Hermosa and TJ Trinidad.

Marianne's last project was the television remake of Panday, which began airing in December 2005. She was Flavio's wife in Panday IV (the original Panday played by FPJ), which hit the theaters in 1984.

Selected filmography

Television
Ang Panday (2005–2006)
Mga Anghel Na Walang Langit (2005–2006)
Sana Ay Ikaw Na Nga (2001–2003)
Basta't Kasama Kita (2003–2004)
Kung Mawawala Ka (2002–2003)
Halik sa Apoy (1998–1999)
Esperanza (1997–1999)
Wansapanataym (1997-2005) 
GMA Telesine Special
Star Drama Theater Presents: Angelika
Maalaala Mo Kaya – Life Story Book (1995)
Ipaglaban Mo (1992-1999) 
Gulong ng Palad (BBC/RPN Soap Opera) (1977–1985)

Film
Dekada '70 (2002)
Hesus, Rebolusyunaryo (2002)
Bukas Na Lang Kita Mamahalin (2001)
FLAMES: The Movie (1997)
Mabuting Kaibigan... Masamang Kaaway (1991)
Mayor Latigo (1991)
Irampa si Mediavillo (1990)
Delima Gang (1989)
Jack Moro (1989)
Arrest: Pat. Rizal Alih – Zamboanga Massacre (1989)
Gawa Na ang Bala Na Papatay sa Iyo (1988)
Ex-Army (1988)
Afuang: Bounty Hunter (1988)
Tubusin Mo ng Dugo (1988)
Classified Operation (1988)
Hitman (1987)
Cabarlo (1987)
Ultimatum: Ceasefire! (1987)
Victor Lopez ng Bangkusay (1986)
Anak ng Tondo (1985)
Isa-Isa Lang! (1985)
Manila Gang War (1985)
Sino si Victor Lopez? (1985)
Muntinlupa (1984)
Ang Panday IV: Ika-Apat Na Aklat (1984)
Hatulan si Baby Angustia (1984)
Sampaloc 1963 (1984)
Zigomar (1984)
Baril at Balisong (1983)
MPD Manhunt Parulan! (1983)
Isang Bala Ka Lang! (1983)
Ang Krus sa Monte Piedra (1983)
Daniel Bartolo ng Sapang Bato (1982)
Kumander .45 (1982)
Anak ng Tulisan (1982)
Pepeng Kaliwete (1982)
Kumander Elpidio Paclibar (1982)
Bandido sa Sapang Bato (1981)
Carding Estrabel: Tirador ng Malabon (1980)
Maynila 1970: Panganib Araw at Gabi (1979)
Batang Salabusab (1979)
Showdown of Martial Arts (1979)
Drigo Garotte: Jai Alai King (1978)
Joe Quintero (1978)
Gusting Pusa (1978)
Ang Lalaki, ang Alamat, ang Baril (1978)
Valentin Labrador (1977)
Tutubing Kalabaw Tutubing Karayom (1977)
Babaing Hiwalay sa Asawa (1976)
Alakdang Gubat (1976)
Ang Leon at ang Daga (1975)
Ibilanggo Si... Cavite Boy (1974)
Love Song (1973)

References

External links

Living people
ABS-CBN personalities
Filipino film actresses
GMA Network personalities
Year of birth missing (living people)
Filipino television actresses
Filipino female models